Zoltán Teszári (born 14 September 1970) is a Romanian businessman of Hungarian origin. He is the founder of Digi Communications.

As of April 2022, Forbes ranked him as the 5th-richest person in Romania with a net worth of $800 million.

References

Living people
1970 births
Romanian businesspeople
People from Oradea
Romanian people of Hungarian descent